Mosier may refer to:
Mosier (surname)
 Mosier, Oregon, a city in Wasco County, Oregon, United States
Jefferson Mosier House in Mosier, Oregon
Mosier Mounds Complex near Mosier, Oregon
Dr. J. R. Mosier Office at Meadville, Crawford County, Pennsylvania, United States